McClintock Hall, also known as McClintock House, is a historic dormitory located on the campus of Wilkes University at Wilkes-Barre, Luzerne County, Pennsylvania.  It was built about 1841, and is a 2 1/2-story, rectangular brick building in the Greek Revival style.  It was renovated in 1863 to take its present appearance.  It was built as the McClintock family residence and used as such into the 1950s, after which it was acquired by Wilkes College and used as a residence hall.

It was added to the National Register of Historic Places in 1972.

References

Buildings and structures in Wilkes-Barre, Pennsylvania
Wilkes University
Residential buildings on the National Register of Historic Places in Pennsylvania
Houses completed in 1841
Greek Revival houses in Pennsylvania
National Register of Historic Places in Luzerne County, Pennsylvania